

Tertiary education

Universities
University of Hong Kong
The Education University of Hong Kong
Chinese University of Hong Kong
Hong Kong University of Science and Technology
City University of Hong Kong
Hong Kong Polytechnic University
Hong Kong Baptist University
Lingnan University
Hong Kong Shue Yan University
Open University of Hong Kong
Hang Seng University of Hong Kong (formerly Hang Seng Management College and Hang Seng School of Commerce)

Post-secondary education
Caritas Bianchi College of Careers
Chu Hai College of Higher Education
Hong Kong Academy for Performing Arts
Hong Kong Nang Yan College of Higher Education
Vocational Training Council
Hong Kong Institute of Vocational Education
Hong Kong College of Technology

Secondary education

Former schools
Hong Kong Sam Yuk Secondary School
Po Leung Kuk Tsing Yi Secondary School (Skill Opportunity)
Sam Yuk Middle School

Primary education

Former schools
Tsing Yi Fishermen's Children's Primary School

Pre-schools

Lists by type
 List of government schools in Hong Kong
 List of international schools in Hong Kong
 List of special schools in Hong Kong
 List of English Schools Foundation schools

Lists by district
 Hong Kong Island and the Islands District
 List of schools in Central and Western District
 List of schools in Eastern District, Hong Kong
 List of schools in Islands District
 List of schools in Southern District, Hong Kong
 List of schools in Wan Chai District

 Kowloon and Sai Kung District
 List of schools in Kowloon City District
 List of schools in Kwun Tong District
 List of schools in Sai Kung District
 List of schools in Sham Shui Po District
 List of schools in Wong Tai Sin District
 List of schools in Yau Tsim Mong District

 New Territories
(East)
 List of schools in North District, Hong Kong
 List of schools in Sha Tin District
 List of schools in Tai Po District
(West)
 List of schools in Kwai Tsing District
 List of schools in Tsuen Wan District
 List of schools in Tuen Mun District
 List of schools in Yuen Long District

Lists by gender
 List of boys' schools in Hong Kong
 List of girls' schools in Hong Kong

Coeducational schools may be seen in other lists.

Lists by religion
 List of Catholic schools in Hong Kong

 Islamic schools
 Islamic Kasim Tuet Memorial College in Chai Wan, Hong Kong Island
 Islamic Dharwood Pau Memorial Primary School (伊斯蘭鮑伯濤紀念小學) in Tsz Wan Shan, Kowloon
 Islamic Primary School (伊斯蘭學校) in Tuen Mun, New Territories
 UMAH International Primary School in Yuen Long
 Islamic Abu Bakar Chui Memorial Kindergarten in Shau Kei Wan
 Islamic Pok Oi Kindergarten in Tsing Yi
 Muslim Community Kindergarten in Wan Chai

See also

References

 
 
 
Schools